Oliver de Vaux (died 1244) Patron of Pentney and Baron Dalston, was a 13th-century English nobleman.

Life
Vaux was a son of Robert de Vaux. Oliver accompanied King John of England to Ireland in 1210; however, he joined the barons against King John in 1215. He attended the meetings of the barons at Stamford and Brackley. Vaux also was part of King Henry III of England's army that invaded Poitou in 1230.

Family
Vaux married Petronilla, the widow of William de Longchamp and Henry de Mara, the daughter and heir of Guy de Croun, and Isabella de Basset, they are known to have had the following issue:
Robert de Vaux, died without issue
William de Vaux, married Alianora de Ferrers, died without issue
John de Vaux, married Sybilla, had issue
Roger de Vaux of Clifton, Cotham and Sibthorpe, married Clementia, had issue
Elianore de Vaux

Citations

References

Year of birth unknown
1244 deaths
13th-century English people
Medieval English knights
Oliver